The mixed relay competition of the Biathlon World Championships 2012 was held on March 1, 2012, starting at 15:30 local time. Defending champions Norway won the event ahead of silver medalist Slovenia and third placed Germany.

Although Slovenia crossed the finish line 8.2 seconds in front of Norway, the jury awarded bonus seconds for the Norwegians because one target did not go down despite Bjoerndalen hitting it, therefore taking an additional penalty loop, which put them ahead of Slovenia into the first place.

Results 
The race started at 15:30.

References

Biathlon World Championships 2012
Mixed sports competitions